Exodus is a contemporary retelling of the Biblical story of Exodus, that was released in 2007. It was directed by Penny Woolcock and was shot on location in Margate, Kent, England. The film, which had a working title 'The Margate Exodus' features the burning of a large sculpture of a man made out of waste by Antony Gormley. The film was shown on Channel 4 on 19 November 2007.

Synopsis 
The leader of the country, called Pharaoh (who is plagued by voices), declares war upon society's 'undesirables'. Drug abusers, refugees, criminals and the homeless are all considered equally worthless and entered into a restricted ghetto, called 'Dreamland' (set in a then dilapidated fun fair of that name, since restored), where they cannot leave.

When Moses learns he was adopted by Pharaoh and is actually the son of an asylum seeker, he shuns his life of privilege to lead the ghetto's inhabitants in a revolt against his father.

A series of 'plagues' echoing the biblical story attack the inhabitants of the 'promised land' including algal blooms which turn the sea red (like the first plague of turning the River Nile to blood) and a computer virus (possibly a modern reworking of the sickness in live stock plague).

The plagues are treated as acts of terrorism by those in the promised land and violent reprisals are sought against those in Dreamland.

References

External links 
 
 

2007 films
British drama films
Films based on the Book of Exodus
Films about the ten plagues of Egypt
Portrayals of Moses in film
Films shot in Kent
2000s English-language films
2000s British films